The Via Francigena is an ancient road and pilgrimage route running from the cathedral city of Canterbury in England, through France and Switzerland, to Rome and then to Apulia, Italy, where there were ports of embarkation for the Holy Land. It was known in Italy as the "Via Francigena" ("the road that comes from France") or the "Via Romea Francigena" ("the road to Rome that comes from France"). In medieval times it was an important road and pilgrimage route for those wishing to visit the Holy See and the tombs of the apostles Peter and Paul.

History of the pilgrimage to Rome 

In the Middle Ages, Via Francigena was the major pilgrimage route to Rome from the north. The route was first documented as the "Lombard Way", and was first called the Iter Francorum (the "Frankish Route") in the Itinerarium sancti Willibaldi of 725, a record of the travels of Willibald, bishop of Eichstätt in Bavaria. It was Via Francigena-Francisca in Italy and Burgundy, the Chemin des Anglois in the Frankish Kingdom (after the evangelisation of England in 607) and also the Chemin Romieu, the road to Rome. The name Via Francigena is first mentioned in the Actum Clusio, a parchment of 876 in the Abbey of San Salvatore at Monte Amiata (Tuscany).

At the end of the 10th century Sigeric the Serious, the Archbishop of Canterbury, used the Via Francigena to and from Rome in order to receive his pallium; he recorded his route and his stops on the return journey, but nothing in the document suggests that the route was then new, nor if he made the journey by foot or on horseback.

Later itineraries to Rome include the Leiðarvísir og borgarskipan of the Icelandic traveller Nikolás Bergsson (in 1154) and the one from Philip Augustus of France (in 1191). Two somewhat differing maps of the route appear in manuscripts of Matthew Paris, Historia Anglorum, from the 13th century.

The Welsh king Rhodri Mawr in 880 and his grandson Hywel Dda in 945 are both known to have visited Rome towards the end of their lives, but it is not known whether they went by land or by sea via the Straits of Gibraltar. The Benedictine William of St-Thierry used the roads towards Rome on several occasions at the end of the 11th century. The return journey by sea was likely to be easier, thanks to the prevailing south-westerly winds, but tacking down to the Mediterranean would have made a very long journey indeed.

The Via Francigena was not a single road, like a Roman road, paved with stone blocks and provided at intervals with a change of horses for official travellers. Rather, it comprised several possible routes that changed over the centuries as trade and pilgrimage waxed and waned. Depending on the time of year, the political situation, and the relative popularity of the shrines of the saints situated along the route, travellers may have used any of three or four crossings of the Alps and the Apennines. The Lombards financed the maintenance and security of the section of road through their territories as a trading route to the north from Rome, avoiding enemy-held cities such as Florence. Unlike Roman roads the Via Francigena did not connect cities, but relied more on abbeys.

Sigeric's itinerary 

Modern pilgrims from England would follow Sigeric's route in the reverse order, and so would journey from Canterbury to the English coast before crossing the Channel to Sumeran (now called Sombres), landing at the village of Wissant. The route continues through Guînes (Sigeric's Gisne), Thérouanne (Teranburh), Bruay (Bruaei), and Arras (Atherats), before continuing on to Reims, Châlons-sur-Marne, Bar-sur-Aube, Langres, Champlitte, Besançon, Pontarlier, Lausanne and Saint-Maurice. From Saint-Maurice, the route traverses the Great St. Bernard Pass to Aosta and then to Ivrea, Vercelli, Pavia, Fidenza, Pontremoli, Filattiera, Aulla, Luni, Lucca, San Gimignano, Poggibonsi, Siena, San Quirico d'Orcia, Bolsena, Viterbo, Sutri, and finally Rome.

The final stretch towards the Apulian ports 

From Rome the path followed for a long stretch the Via Appia or the parallel Via Latina up to Benevento. From that town Via Traiana was taken up the Campanian Apennines and Daunian Mountains, where  stood, a fortress held by the Knights of Jerusalem in order to guarantee the safety of pilgrims along the mountain stretch. The road therefore reached Troia, in the high plain of Tavoliere delle Puglie (where Via Francigena is attested since 1024), and then continued towards Bari, Brindisi and Otranto, the main ports of embarkation for the Holy Land.

Today 
Today some pilgrims still follow in Sigeric's ancient footsteps and travel on foot, on horseback or by bicycle on the Via Francigena, although there are far fewer pilgrims on this route than on the Way of St. James pilgrims' route to Santiago de Compostela in Spain. Roughly 1,200 pilgrims were estimated to have walked the Via Francigena in 2012. One reason for this is a lack of infrastructure and suitable support facilities. Affordable pilgrims' accommodation and other facilities can be hard to come by for those traveling along the route. In 2011, James Saward-Anderson and Maxwell Hannah ran the entire route for Water Aid. They completed the route unassisted in 58 days.

Accommodation 

Due to the scarcity of dedicated pilgrims' accommodation along the Via Francigena, pilgrims often camp out rather than staying in hotels or pensions. However increasingly in Italy, some monasteries and religious houses offer dedicated pilgrim's accommodation. These are called spedali and — like the refugios found on the Way of St. James in France and Spain — they offer cheap and simple dormitory-style accommodation. Spedali accept pilgrims who bear a valid credenziale (pilgrim's passport), usually for one night only. Some places offer meals as well.

As of 2016, the old guest houses dedicated to pilgrims were not reconditioned by tourist operators, due to the lack of economic return.

The state and path of the route 

Only a few decades ago, interest in the Via Francigena was limited to scholars. This began to change in recent years when many who, after travelling the Way of St. James in Spain, wanted to make the pilgrimage to Rome on foot as well. In Italy, this gave birth to a network of lovers of the Via Francigena, who with paint and brush, began to mark its trails and paths. These people were joined by religious and local government agencies who also tried to recover the original route. Where possible today's route follows the ancient one but sometimes it deviates from the historical path in favour of paths and roads with low traffic. The potential for the tourist trade in Italy has been recognised but this has also led some to gain unfair economic advantage by diverting the path so that it passes next to their business, thus increasing footfall.

In England, the Via Francigena starts at the southern portico of Canterbury’s cathedral where the milestone zero of the route is located. The route passes through part of the county of Kent, from Canterbury to the ferries at Dover.

In France, the Via Francigena (given the Grande Randonnée designation 'GR145') goes through the régions Hauts-de-France, Grand-Est and Bourgogne-Franche-Comté before reaching the Swiss border.

In Switzerland the Via Francigena (with the route designation '70') goes through the cantons of Vaud and Valais.

In Italy the Via Francigena goes through the Regione of Valle d'Aosta, Piedmont, Lombardy, Emilia-Romagna, Tuscany, and finally about halfway through Lazio to Rome.

Walkers could choose to walk along the EuroVelo EV5 cycling route which bears the name the 'Via Francigena'. However, this EuroVelo route varies substantially from Sigeric's route and the one given by the Via Francigena Association.

In 1994 the Via Francigena was designated a Cultural Route, and in 2004 a Major Cultural Route.

In November 2009 the Italian government launched a project to recover the Italian leg of it. The object of the plan is to recover the entire route (disjointed parts of which are already signposted) "not only in spiritual and religious terms but also in terms of the environment, architecture, culture, history, wine and cuisine and sport." The initiative was promoted by the Region of Tuscany, which hosts  of the Via, and which presented a plan detailing the low environmental impact infrastructures to be created.  The plan will be shared with other local authorities located along the route as an encouragement to carry out similar recovery work.  Tuscany has also announced cooperation with the Opera Romana Pellegrinaggi (ORP), the Vatican’s organisation for encouraging pilgrimages.

The final stretch, from Rome to the Apulian ports of embarcation for Jerusalem, has been renamed Via Francigena nel Sud (in Italian "Via Francigena in the South (Italy)") or else Vie Francigene del Sud ("The Francigena Ways to the South").

 Gallery 

 See also 
Way of St. James
Valdorcia
Ponte della Maddalena – a river crossing en route.
Order of the Holy Sepulchre – The Order of the Holy Sepulchre was one such order of Pilgrimage providing Hospices on the Vía. (The road to Jerusalem lay through Rome, as it still does for the intrepid.)
EV5 Via Romea Francigena, a long-distance cycling route also running from London to Rome.
CoEur devotional path

 References 

 Sources 
Kerschbaum & Gattinger, Via Francigena – DVD- Documentary of a modern pilgrimage to Rome, Verlag EUROVIA, Vienna 2005
Trezzini,  La Via Francigena. Vademecum dal Gran San Bernardo a Roma La Via Francigena. Vademecum dal Gran San Bernardo a Roma (Association Via Francigena) 2000
 Adelaide Trezzini-AIVF. San Pellegrino sulle Via Francigene. Ed. Gangemi Cod. 
 Adelaide Trezzini-AIVF. Topofrancigena da Canterbury a Roma (2004–2007) Ed. Ass. int. Via Francigena
 Adelaide Trezzini-AIVF. Guide-Vademecum da Canterbury a Roma. Ed.2002–03
 Adelaide Trezzini-AIVF. Dormifrancigena da Canterbury a Roma.2006 + 2007 Ed. Ass. int. Via Francigena

 External links 

 Via Francigena on URCamino
 Canterbury City Council local info on the route through the UK
 BBC News– Epic run from Canterbury to Rome follows pilgrimage
  The GR145 Via Francigena in the Champagne-Ardenne region of France
 Italian Ministry of Cultural and Heritage Multiple language site of the official route in Italy including roadbooks, GPS and maps
 La Via Francigena website for Italy (in Italian & English)
 The Via Francigena in Southern Italy, from Rome to Apulia (English version)

 Via Francigena associations 
  Asociación de la vía Francígena en España
 Association Internationale Via Francigena Active since 1997 promoting cultural and tourist awareness of the Via Francigena to Roma
 Confraternity of Pilgrims to Rome United Kingdom pilgrim association providing information on the Via Francigena
 European Association of Vie Francigene Information on the route through Italy
  Dutch Association Dutch Association of pilgrims walking or cycling to Rome
 Via Francigena Association in Switzerland
  EUROVIA Austrian pilgrim Association supporting pilgrims to Rome (German/English/Italian)
 Camminando sulla Via Francigena. The Italian Community of pilgrims 3.0 (choose your language)

 Related routes 
  La Francigena in Garfagnana Route between Aulla and Lucca through the Garfagnana in Italy (in Italian)''
 Via Francigena di San Francesco Route from Roma to Rieti.
  Via Francigena Appia Pedemontana Route from Roma to Formia

Christian pilgrimages
European Cultural Routes
Hiking trails in Europe
Hiking trails in Italy
Hiking trails in Switzerland
Italian words and phrases
Medieval roads and tracks
Pilgrimage routes